"A New Flame" is a song by English soul band Simply Red, released in June 1989 as the third single from their third studio album by the same name (1989). It was written by Mick Hucknall and produced by Stewart Levine. The song was a top-20 hit in the UK, peaking at number 17 on the UK Singles Chart, and reached the top 30 in Ireland, the Netherlands, and New Zealand.

Critical reception
Mike Soutar from Smash Hits wrote, "'A New Flame' is pretty much as you'd expect it to sound, i.e. Mick Hucknall proves he's got a fine set of pipes, it's perfectly pleasant and not much else. A hit. But not for very long."

Music video
A music video was produced to promote the single, directed by Vaughan Arnell and Anthea Benton. It was later published on Simply Red's official YouTube channel in 2009, and had generated more than 6 million views as of March 2023.

Track listing
 7", UK (1989)
"A New Flame"
"More"

 12", UK (1989)
"A New Flame"
"More"
"I Asked Her for Water" (Live)
"Resume" (Live)

 CD mini, Europe (1989)
"A New Flame" — 3:57
"More" — 4:06
"I Asked Her for Water" (Live) — 5:52
"Resume" (Live) — 4:05

Charts

References

1989 singles
1989 songs
Simply Red songs
Pop ballads
Music videos directed by Vaughan Arnell
Songs written by Mick Hucknall